Belmont Center is an MBTA Commuter Rail station in Belmont, Massachusetts. It serves the Fitchburg Line. It is situated at the intersection of Common Street, Concord Avenue, and Leonard Street adjacent to Belmont's town center. It is one of two railroad stations located in Belmont, the other being Waverley station located in Waverley Square.

The modern station was built in 1908 after the completion of a grade separation project in which the railroad tracks were raised above grade. There are two low-level side platforms serving the line's two tracks on an elevated grade. The station has no high-level platforms or ramps and is therefore not handicapped accessible. The station does not have a ticket office or ticket vending machines, meaning passengers must purchase tickets on board the trains.

History

Early days

Wellington Hill station opened in 1852, with a former school building built the previous decade moved to the site for a depot. A two-story wooden depot was built around 1879; the old station was moved and used as a summer house and an art studio at the Underwood Estate nearby. It was given to the Belmont Historical Society in 1975, and moved to its present location across the street from the modern station in 1980.

Track elevation
To eliminate the busy grade crossing of Concord Avenue, the tracks through Belmont Center were raised in 1907. A massive two-story California Bungalow station was built from 365 tons of fieldstone quarried from Belmont Hill by a local farmer. All service to Belmont Center and nearby Waverley ended in 1958.

MBTA era and accessibility

Service to Belmont Center and Waverley resumed on March 4, 1974. The Central Mass Branch had been discontinued in 1971, so all service was on the South Acton (now Fitchburg) Line. Weekend service was discontinued at the two stops on January 30, 1981 as part of general cutbacks, but restored on December 6, 1993.

The 1908-built station building, which is now owned and occupied by the Belmont Lions Club, was added to the National Register of Historic Places on December 4, 1998.
 
As part of budget cuts, the MBTA was considering an option to shutter the current Belmont station as well as Waverley station and build a new stop in between.
Plans to combine both stations have been outlined in previous studies as early as 2005. Such works as  Fitchburg Commuter Rail Line Improvement Implementation Plan, released in September 2005 have considered this plan. However, plans for a new station were dropped in January 2016. , there are no active plans to upgrade Belmont Center and make it ADA-accessible.

See also
National Register of Historic Places listings in Middlesex County, Massachusetts

References

External links

MBTA - Belmont
 Concord Avenue entrance from Google Maps Street View
 Station House from Google Maps Street View

Belmont, Massachusetts
Stations along Boston and Maine Railroad lines
MBTA Commuter Rail stations in Middlesex County, Massachusetts
Railway stations in the United States opened in 1852
Railway stations on the National Register of Historic Places in Massachusetts
National Register of Historic Places in Middlesex County, Massachusetts
Lions Clubs International
1852 establishments in Massachusetts
Railway stations in the United States opened in 1974
Railway stations closed in 1958